Roskilde Congress & Sports Centre (Danish: Roskilde Kongres & Idrætscenter)  is a multi-purpose venue in downtown Roskilde, Denmark. It is used for conferences, meetings, sport events, fairs, concerts, theatre and parties. There are rooms and halls for 20 to 2,500 guests and an exhibition area of 6,500 square metres.

History
Roskilde Congress & Sports Centre opened in 1959. The latest expansion was designed by Christensen & Co. and completed in 2013.

Facilities
Roskilde Congress and Sports Centre comprises four halls with a total floor area of 13,500 square metres as well as a number of smaller meeting rooms. The newest and largest hall, Hall D, has room for 2,000 seated spectators for sport events and approximately 4,000 spectators for concerts. It is the home ground of Roskilde Handball Club.  Other facilities include a restaurant overlooking Roskilde Cathedral and 750 free parking places.

References

External links
 Official website

Sport in Roskilde
Sports venues in Denmark
Roskilde
Handball venues in Denmark
Indoor arenas in Denmark
Basketball venues in Denmark
1959 establishments in Denmark
Music venues in Denmark
Performing arts venues in Denmark
Convention centres in Denmark
Event venues in Denmark